This is a list of women writers who were born in Puerto Rico or whose writings are closely associated with that country.

A
Silvia Álvarez Curbelo (born 1940), historian, non-fiction writer
Isabel Andreu de Aguilar (1887–1948), suffragist, feminist writer
Delma S. Arrigoitia (born 1945), historian, biographer
Yolanda Arroyo Pizarro (born 1970), novelist, short story writer, essayist

B
Marilyn Batista Márquez (born 1959), journalist, short story writer
Janette Becerra (born 1965), short story writer, poet, critic
Alejandrina Benítez de Gautier (1819–1879), poet
María Bibiana Benítez (1783–1873), Puerto Rico's first female poet, playwright
Giannina Braschi (born 1953), novelist, poet, essayist, playwright
Julia de Burgos (1914–1953), acclaimed poet, activist

C
Zenobia Camprubí (1887–1956), Spanish-born poet, diarist, translator
Luisa Capetillo (1879–1922), anarchist, feminist writer
Caridad de la Luz (born 1977), Nuyorican poet, actress, activist
Edna Coll (1906–2002), educator, writer of literary works
Isabel Cuchí Coll (1904–1993), playwright, short story writer, journalist, non-fiction writer

D
Jaquira Díaz, fiction writer, essayist, author or Ordinary Girls

E
Sandra María Esteves (born 1948), Nuyorican poet, artist

F
Rosario Ferré (1938–2016), novelist, essayist, poet, educator
Isabel Freire de Matos (1915–2004), educator, journalist, children's writer, independence activist

G
Gilda Galán (1917–2009), actress, playwright, poet
Magali García Ramis (born 1946), short story writer, journalist, novelist, essayist 
Migene González-Wippler, since the 1980s, books on the Santería religious sect in Spanish and English

J
Zoé Jiménez Corretjer, since the 1980s: poet, short story writer, essayist

L
Georgina Lázaro (born 1965), journalist, novelist, poet, children's writer
Aurora Levins Morales (born 1954), poet, biographer, non-fiction writer, feminist
Teresita A. Levy (born 1970), educator, historian, author of The History of Tobacco Cultivation in Puerto Rico, 1898-1940.

M
Nemir Matos-Cintrón (born 1949), poet
Concha Meléndez (1895–1983), poet, essayist, educator
Nancy Mercado (born 1959), Post-Beat writer, Nuyorican poet, essayist, fiction writer, playwright, editor, activist
Nicholasa Mohr (born 1938), Nuyorican novelist, children's writer, short story writer
Rosario Morales (1930–2011), poet, essayist, raised in New York City

N
Vionette Negretti (born 1947), journalist, writer
Frances Negrón-Muntaner (born 1966), film-maker, literary critic, essayist, screenwriter
Mercedes Negrón Muñoz (1895–1973), poet

O
Ana María O'Neill (1894–1981), educator, women's rights activist, non-fiction author
Judith Ortiz Cofer (1952–2016), poet, short story writer, essayist, children's writer, autobiographer, educator

P
Olivia Paoli (1855–1942), suffragist, magazine editor

S
Esmeralda Santiago (born 1948), novelist, memoirist, actress
Mayra Santos-Febres (born 1966), poet, essayist, short story writer, novelist
Mercedes Sola (1879–1923), educator, women's rights activist, feminist writer

U
Luz María Umpierre (born 1947), poet, critic, human rights activist

V
Lourdes Vázquez, since the 1980s, short story writer, novelist, poet essayist
Ana Lydia Vega (born 1946), acclaimed short story writer, essayist
Irene Vilar (born c.1969), editor, memoirist, author of The Ladies' Gallery: A Memoir of Family Secrets

Z
Iris Zavala (1936–2020), poet, novelist, essayist, non-fiction writer, educator

See also
List of women writers
List of Puerto Rican writers
List of Spanish-language authors

References

-
Puerto Rican
Writers
Writers, women